Marine Corps Installations Pacific (MCIPAC) is the single, regional authority for accountability of regional installation management resources and services within the Pacific area of operations. MCIPAC was established to increase regional installation management effectiveness. MCIPAC implements policies, develops regional strategies and plans, prioritizes resources, and provides services, direction, and oversight to all Marine Corps installations in Japan, the Republic of Korea, and Hawaii.

MCIPAC includes approximately 2,600 service members, 1,200 civilian employees, and more than 3,500 Japanese and Korean workers in the Pacific Region. Whether participating in operations or training exercises, MCIPAC supports units before, during, and after each deployment. The command is responsible for ensuring installations provide a number of services like training areas, work facilities, utilities and housing.

MCIPAC remains committed to enhancing operational readiness, from the individual service member to every echelon of the Marine Air Ground Task Force, while at the same time, cooperating, coordinating and communicating with our regional communities, partners, and allies. MCIPAC regularly engages in bilateral planning to ensure strong, long-term and mutually beneficial partnerships with our neighbors in the region. These continually developing relationships define MCIPAC's community relations effort.

Mission

Marine Corps Installations Pacific is commanded by a major general, with its headquarters residing aboard Camp Foster. Its mission is to provide the operating forces and tenant commands with the highest quality of continuous, effective service and support to meet present and future operating force requirements.

Subordinate commands

 Marine Corps Base Camp Smedley D. Butler
 Marine Corps Base Hawaii
 Marine Corps Air Station Iwakuni
 Marine Corps Air Station Futenma
 Combined Arms Training Center Camp Fuji
 Camp Mujuk, South Korea

Unit Awards

See also

 Marine Corps Installations West
 Marine Corps Installations East
 Marine Corps Installations Command

References

United States Marine Corps organization